Yashiro Japanese Garden is a Japanese garden located in Olympia, Washington, United States. Designed by Robert Murase and dedicated on May 6, 1990, the garden was created to symbolize the relationship between Olympia and its sister city of Yashiro, Japan.

References

External links
 
 Brochure

Japanese gardens in the United States
Japanese-American culture in Washington (state)
Parks in Olympia, Washington